Copaifera epunctata is a species of flowering plant in the pea family, Fabaceae, that is endemic to Suriname.

References

epunctata
Flora of Suriname
Vulnerable plants
Taxonomy articles created by Polbot